Irwin Keyes (March 16, 1952 – July 8, 2015) was an American actor and comedian, best known for his recurring role as Hugo on The Jeffersons. He appeared in several films and several television series.

Early life
Keyes was born in New York on March 16, 1952. Keyes grew up in Amityville, New York and graduated from Amityville Memorial High School in 1970. He acted in his first play "The Lower Depths" by Maxim Gorky while attending college. Frequently cast as likable lugs, brutish goons, and imposing authority figures, Irwin acted in a diverse array of movies in such genres as horror, comedy, thriller, science fiction, and action. Keyes achieved his greatest popularity with his recurring role as oafish bodyguard Hugo Majelewski on the sitcom The Jeffersons. Among the TV shows that Irwin made guest appearances on are Laverne & Shirley, Police Squad!, Moonlighting, Married... with Children, thirtysomething, Growing Pains, Tales from the Crypt, and CSI: Crime Scene Investigation. Keyes also performed in television commercials and music videos, and did voiceover work for video games. Irwin lived in Los Angeles, California and continued to act until his death.

Death
On July 8, 2015, Keyes died at the Playa Del Rey Center in Los Angeles, California of complications of acromegaly at age 63.

Filmography
 1978 Team-Mates as Frank "Big Frank"
 1978 Manny's Orphans as "Shove"
 1979 The Warriors as Police Officer
 1979 Nocturna: Granddaughter of Dracula as Transylvania Character
 1979 Squeeze Play! as Bouncer
 1979 The Prize Fighter as "Flower"
 1979 The Gang That Sold America as Support Killer
 1980 Friday the 13th as Busboy (uncredited)
 1980 Bloodrage as Pimp In Hallway
 1980 The Exterminator as Bobby
 1980 Stardust Memories as Fan Outside Hotel
 1980 The Private Eyes as Jock
 1981 Lovely But Deadly as Gommorah
 1981-1984 The Jeffersons (TV Series) as Hugo Mojelewski
 1982 Police Squad! (TV Series) as Luca
 1982 Zapped! as "Too Mean" Levine
 1983 Chained Heat as Lorenzo
 1984 Exterminator 2 "Monster"
 1987 Nice Girls Don't Explode as Cocker
 1987 Married... with Children (TV Series) as Mr. Hugo 
 1987 Death Wish 4: The Crackdown as Joey, Bauggs' Chauffeur
 1988 Frankenstein General Hospital as The Monster
 1988 Kandyland as Biff
 1989 Growing Pains (TV Series) as Jeff
 1990 Down the Drain as Patrick
 1990 Mob Boss as Monk
 1990 Disturbed as Pat Tuel
 1991 Guilty as Charged as Deek
 1991 Adventures in Dinosaur City as Guard #1
 1991 Motorama as Hunchback Attendant
 1992 On the Air (TV Series) as "Shorty", The Stagehand
 1992 Tales from the Crypt (TV Series) as Figure
 1993 Magic Kid as The Bookie
 1993 Dream Lover as Officer
 1993 Sam & Max Hit the Road (Video Game) as Bruno (voice)
 1993 Double Switch (Video Game) as Brutus
 1994 The Silence of the Hams as Guard
 1994 Oblivion as Bork
 1994 The Flintstones as Joe Rockhead
 1995 Get Smart (TV Series) as Agent 0 / Drowning Victim 
 1995 The Power Within as Mosh
 1995 Timemaster as Orphanage Aide
 1996 Oblivion 2: Backlash as Bork
 1996 Pure Danger as "Killjoy"
 1998 The Godson as Tracy Dick
 1999 Tequila Body Shots as Jailman #1
 2000 The Flintstones in Viva Rock Vegas as Joe Rockhead
 2001 The Vampire Hunters Club (Video Short) as Obnoxious Dancer
 2001 Perfect Fit as Otto, Convict
 2002 Legend of the Phantom Rider as Bigfoot
 2003 House of 1000 Corpses as Ravelli
 2003 Intolerable Cruelty as Joe "Wheezy Joe"
 2005 Neighborhood Watch as Vernon
 2005 ShadowBox as The Mechanic
 2006 Wristcutters: A Love Story as Stiff Drinks Bartender
 2006 Sent as Judas
 2006 Wrestlemaniac as The Stranger
 2007 Dream Slashers as The Mechanic
 2007 Careless as Bob "Woodsman Bob"
 2007 DarkPlace as The Mechanic
 2007 CSI: Crime Scene Investigation (TV Series) as Russ Beauxdreaux
 2008 The Urn as Albert
 2008 Doesn't Texas Ever End
 2009 Black Dynamite as Henchman
 2010 Dahmer vs. Gacy as Dr. Pruitt
 2009 Glass Houses
 2011 Ham Sandwich (Short) as Hunchback
 2011 Evil Bong 3: The Wrath of Bong as The Killer
 2012 The Master & Me (Short) as Ygor
 2013 Dead Kansas as Giant
 2013 Pretty Little Liars (TV Series) as "Creepy"
 2014 Catch of the Day as Kletus Thorne
 2014 Titano (Short) as Titano
 2015 Angel Investors
 2015 Portend
 2016 The Caretaker as Sebastian

References
Irwin Keyes has permanent exhibit at The Hollywood Museum.

External links

 

1952 births
2015 deaths
American male voice actors
American male comedians
American male film actors
American male television actors
Male actors from New York City
People with acromegaly
Comedians from New York City